During embryonic development of the eye, the outer wall of the bulb of the optic vesicles becomes thickened and invaginated, and the bulb is thus converted into a cup, the optic cup (or ophthalmic cup), consisting of two strata of cells.  These two strata are continuous with each other at the cup margin, which ultimately overlaps the front of the lens and reaches as far forward as the future aperture of the pupil.

The optic cup is part of the diencephalon and gives rise to the retina of the eye.

References

External links
 Overview at temple.edu
 Overview at vision.ca

Embryology of nervous system
Eye